China United may refer to:
 China United Airlines
 China United Coalbed Methane
 China Unicom